is a yonkoma manga series written and illustrated by Ran Igarashi. A live action film adaptation was released on September 6, 2014.

Characters
Gorō Hōzuki (Tomoya Maeno)
Haru Hōzuki (Momoko Tani)
Ai Mizuno (Kayo Satoh)

Film cast
Tomoya Maeno
Momoko Tani
Kayo Satō
Yukie Kawamura
Hitomi Yoshizaki
Amane Okayama
Reiko Hayama
Shingo Mizusawa
Fuyuki Moto

References

External links

Romantic comedy anime and manga
Kadokawa Shoten manga
Kadokawa Dwango franchises
Manga adapted into films
Seinen manga
Yonkoma
Live-action films based on manga
Japanese romantic comedy films